The AFL Central West (formerly, Central West Australian Football League) is an Australian rules football competition containing five clubs based in the Central West region of New South Wales, Australia.

Current Clubs

Tier 2

Previous Clubs

List of Premiers

First-Grade

Reserve-Grade 

1984: Dubbo
1985: Dubbo
1986: Dubbo
1987: Cowra
1988: Lithgow
1992: Dubbo
1993: Orange
1994: Dubbo
1995: Bathurst Eagles
1996: Orange

1997: Parkes
1998: Kelso
1999: Parkes
2000: Dubbo
2001: Orange
2002: Dubbo
2003: Cowra
2004: Bathurst Bushrangers
2005: Mudgee
2006: Cowra

2007: Bathurst Bushrangers
2008: Cowra
2009: Bathurst Bushrangers
2010: Young
2011: Bathurst Bushrangers
2012: Orange
2013: Bathurst Bushrangers
2014: Bathurst Bushrangers
2015: Young
2020: Parkes
2021: Parkes

Under 16s/17s/18s 

1983: Young
1984: Orange
1985: Orange
1986: Orange
1987: Dubbo
1988: Parkes
1989: Parkes
1990: Parkes
1991: Cowra
1996: Parkes
1997: Parkes

1998: Kelso
1999: Parkes
2000: Parkes
2001: Cowra
2002: Bathurst Eagles
2003: Bathurst Eagles
2004: Bathurst Bushrangers
2005: Bathurst Bushrangers
2006: Bathurst Bushrangers
2007: Bathurst Bushrangers
2008: Bathurst Bushrangers

2009: Bathurst Bushrangers
2010: Dubbo
2011: Dubbo
2012: Dubbo
2013: Bathurst Bushrangers
2014: Bathurst Bushrangers
2015: Bathurst Bushrangers
2016: Bathurst Giants
2017: Bathurst Giants
2018: Bathurst Giants
2019: Orange Tigers
2020: Bathurst Giants
2021: Bathurst Giants

Under 13s/14s/15s 

2000: Parkes
2001: Orange
2002: Orange
2003: Bathurst Eagles
2004: Bathurst Bushrangers
2005: Bathurst Bushrangers
2006: Bathurst Bushrangers

2007: Orange
2008: Dubbo
2009: Bathurst Bushrangers
2010: Bathurst Bushrangers
2011: Dubbo
2012: Young
2013: Bathurst Bushrangers

2014: Bathurst Giants
2015: Bathurst Giants
2016: Bathurst Giants
2017: Bathurst Giants
2018: Cowra
2019: Orange

Under 12s/11s 

2011: Bathurst Bushrangers
2012: Bathurst Bushrangers
2013: Bathurst Bushrangers

2014: Orange
2015: Bathurst Giants
2016: Cowra

2017: Orange
2018: Cowra
2019: Cowra

Women's 
2015: Bathurst Bushrangers
2016: Bathurst Bushrangers
2017: Bathurst Bushrangers
2018: Dubbo
2019: Bathurst Giants

Youth Girls 

2018: Orange
2019: Bathurst Giants

2011 Ladder

2012 Ladder

2013 Ladder

See also
AFL NSW/ACT
Australian rules football in New South Wales

External links
 

Australian rules football competitions in New South Wales